Samuel Hurst Seager  (26 June 1855 – 5 October 1933) was a notable New Zealand builder, draftsman, architect and town planner. He was born in London, England, in 1855, and as a boy emigrated to Christchurch, New Zealand, with his parents in 1870.

He was one of the pioneers of the New Zealand bungalow. He purchased land on Clifton Hill in Sumner and designed and established a garden suburb with eight bungalows which were sold in 1914. Seager resided at No.1 The Spur for eight years from 1902.

Two of his notable buildings are Daresbury at 67 Fendalton Road and the Christchurch Municipal Chambers.

In the 1926 King's Birthday Honours, he was appointed a Commander of the Order of the British Empire.

Gallery of his work

References

1855 births
1933 deaths
Architects from London
English emigrants to New Zealand
People from Christchurch
New Zealand Commanders of the Order of the British Empire
19th-century New Zealand architects
20th-century New Zealand architects